The canton of Claye-Souilly is a French administrative division, located in the arrondissement of Torcy, in the Seine-et-Marne département (Île-de-France région).

Demographics

Composition 
At the French canton reorganisation which came into effect in March 2015, the canton was expanded from 6 to 30 communes:

Annet-sur-Marne
Barcy
Chambry
Charmentray
Charny
Claye-Souilly 
Crégy-lès-Meaux
Cuisy
Forfry
Fresnes-sur-Marne
Gesvres-le-Chapitre
Gressy
Isles-lès-Villenoy
Iverny
Mareuil-lès-Meaux
Messy
Monthyon
Chauconin-Neufmontiers
Oissery
Penchard
Le Plessis-aux-Bois
Le Plessis-l'Évêque
Précy-sur-Marne
Saint-Mesmes
Saint-Soupplets
Trilbardou
Varreddes
Vignely
Villenoy
seatroy

See also
Cantons of the Seine-et-Marne department
Communes of the Seine-et-Marne department

References

Claye-Souilly